Russum is an unincorporated community located in Claiborne County, Mississippi, United States. Russum is located on the former Yazoo and Mississippi Valley Railroad.

A post office operated under the name Russum from 1884 to 1955.

References

Unincorporated communities in Claiborne County, Mississippi
Unincorporated communities in Mississippi